NO4 may refer to

Orthonitrate, a chemical ion composed of nitrogen and oxygen with a 3− charge
Peroxynitrate, another chemical ion composed of nitrogen and oxygen with a 1− charge